John William "Bill" Westwood (1886–191?) was a professional association footballer, who played for Rotherham Town, Gainsborough Trinity, Denaby United and Bristol Rovers.

He played 98 times in the Southern League for Bristol Rovers before the First World War.

He died serving in the First World War.

His grandson is World Darts Champion Dennis Priestley.

References

1886 births
1910s deaths
Footballers from Sheffield
English footballers
Association football midfielders
English Football League players
Southern Football League players
Gainsborough Trinity F.C. players
Denaby United F.C. players
Bristol Rovers F.C. players
Rotherham Town F.C. (1899) players
British military personnel killed in World War I